Feixiang is a district of southern Hebei province, China, served directly by China National Highway 309.

Administrative divisions
There are 2 towns and 7 townships under the county's administration.

Towns:
Feixiang, Tiantaishan

Townships:
Daxihan Township, Xin'anzhen Township, Maoyanbao Township, Yuangu Township, Tunzhuangying Township, Dongzhangbao Township, Jiudian Township

Climate

References

County-level divisions of Hebei
Handan